Lecanora printzenii is a species of crustose lichen in the family Lecanoraceae. Known from Spain, it was described as new to science in 2011.

See also
List of Lecanora species

References

Lichen species
Lichens described in 2011
Lichens of Southwestern Europe
printzenii
Taxa named by Josef Hafellner